Zhao Wenzhe (born 10 January 2001) is a Chinese footballer currently playing as a defender for Guangzhou.

Career statistics

Club
.

References

2001 births
Living people
Footballers from Henan
Chinese footballers
Association football defenders
Chinese Super League players
Henan Songshan Longmen F.C. players
Villarreal CF players
Guangzhou F.C. players
Chinese expatriate footballers
Chinese expatriate sportspeople in Spain
Expatriate footballers in Spain